This is a list of geographical features in the state of Mecklenburg-Vorpommern, Germany.

Cities 
see List of cities in Mecklenburg-Vorpommern

Rivers 

 Peene
 Warnow
 Tollense

Lakes 

 Müritz Lake
 Schweriner See

Islands 

 Hiddensee
 Poel
 Rügen
 Ummanz
 Usedom

Miscellaneous 

 Darß
 Mecklenburg
 Müritz National Park
 Vorpommern
 Western Pomerania Lagoon Area National Park

Mecklenburg
Mecklenburg-Western Pomerania-related lists
Geography of Mecklenburg-Western Pomerania